Black Elvis may refer to:
An alias used by Kool Keith
His album Black Elvis/Lost in Space performed under this alias.
A single released by Goldblade in 1996

People 
Australian country singer Roger Knox is also known as the Black Elvis
American singer Clearance Giddens is often referred to as Black Elvis
American singer Robert Washington is also called Black Elvis
American singer and street entertainer Blelvis is often referred to as Black Elvis